The Burmese short-tailed shrew (Blarinella wardi) is one of three species of shrew in the genus Blarinella. It is in the family Soricidae and is found in China and Myanmar. Its natural habitat is subtropical or tropical dry forests.

Sources

Blarinella
Mammals described in 1915
Taxa named by Oldfield Thomas
Taxonomy articles created by Polbot